Lüdao Airport  is an airport serving Lüdao, in Taitung County, Taiwan (ROC).

History
The airport was built in 1972, and was under the control of the Taiwan Garrison Command. It was rebuilt in 1977, and is now under control of the Civil Aeronautics Administration. An airport expansion project was implemented in 1995.

Facilities

Airlines and destinations

See also
 Civil Aeronautics Administration (Taiwan)
 Transportation in Taiwan
 List of airports in Taiwan

References

External links

 

Airports established in 1972
Airports in Taitung County
1972 establishments in Taiwan